Colm Reilly (born 8 September 1999) is an Irish rugby union player for Connacht in the Pro14. Reilly's primary position is scrum-half.

He is the son of Stephen Reilly, a former principal of Garbally College.

Rugby career

Reilly came through the Connacht academy, signing his first professional contract in June 2020. He debuted for Connacht in October 2020 in Round 3 of the 2020–21 Pro14 against Edinburgh.

External links
itsrugby Profile

References

1999 births
Living people
Connacht Rugby players
Rugby union scrum-halves
People from Ballinasloe
People educated at Garbally College
Rugby union players from County Galway